Operating system Wi-Fi support is the support in the operating system for Wi-Fi and usually consists of two pieces: driver level support, and configuration and management support.

Driver support is usually provided by multiple manufacturers of the chip set hardware or end manufacturers. Also available are Unix clones such as Linux, sometimes through open source projects.

Configuration and management support consists of software to enumerate, join, and check the status of available Wi-Fi networks. This also includes support for various encryption methods. These systems are often provided by the operating system backed by a standard driver model. In most cases, drivers emulate an Ethernet device and use the configuration and management utilities built into the operating system. In cases where built-in configuration and management support is non-existent or inadequate, hardware manufacturers may include their own software to handle the respective tasks.

Microsoft Windows
Microsoft Windows has comprehensive driver-level support for Wi-Fi, the quality of which depends on the hardware manufacturer. Hardware manufactures almost always ship Windows drivers with their products. Windows ships with very few Wi-Fi drivers and depends on the original equipment manufacturers (OEMs) and device manufacturers to make sure users get drivers. Configuration and management depend on the version of Windows.
Earlier versions of Windows, such as 98, ME and 2000 do not have built-in configuration and management support and must depend on software provided by the manufacturer
Microsoft Windows XP has built-in configuration and management support. The original shipping version of Windows XP included rudimentary support which was dramatically improved in Service Pack 2.  Support for WPA2 and some other security protocols require updates from Microsoft. Many hardware manufacturers include their own software and require the user to disable Windows’ built-in Wi-Fi support.
 Windows Vista, Windows 7, Windows 8, and Windows 10 have improved Wi-Fi support over Windows XP with a better interface and a suggestion to connect to a public Wi-Fi when no other connection is available.

macOS and Classic Mac OS

Apple was an early adopter of Wi-Fi, introducing its AirPort product line, based on the 802.11b standard, in July 1999. Apple later introduced AirPort Extreme, an implementation of 802.11g. All Apple computers, starting with the original iBook in 1999, either included AirPort 802.11 networking or were designed specifically to provide 802.11 networking with only the addition of the internal AirPort Card (or, later, an AirPort Extreme Card), connecting to the computer's built-in antennae. All Intel-based Macs either come with built-in AirPort Extreme or a slot for an AirPort card, and all portable Macs (all MacBooks and the earlier iBooks and PowerBooks) have included Wi-Fi for several years. In late 2006, Apple began shipping Macs with Broadcom Wi-Fi chips that also supported the Draft 802.11n standard, but this capability was disabled and Apple did not claim or advertise the hardware's capability until some time later when the draft had progressed further. At the January 2007 Macworld Expo, Apple announced that their computers would begin shipping with Draft 802.11n support. Systems shipped with this hidden capability can easily be unlocked through software, but due to the accounting requirements of Sarbanes-Oxley, Apple cannot freely add features to already-sold hardware and so must nominally sell an upgrade. This "upgrade" is included in the price of an AirPort Extreme Base Station for all computers owned by the purchaser, and Apple sells the "upgrade" separately (as the "AirPort Extreme 802.11n Enabler for Mac") for about US$2 in the United States and at similar prices elsewhere.

Apple produces the operating system, the computer hardware, the accompanying drivers, AirPort Wi-Fi base stations, and configuration and management software, simplifying Wi-Fi integration, set-up, and maintenance (including security updates). The built-in configuration and management is integrated throughout many of the operating system's applications and utilities. Mac OS X has Wi-Fi support, including WPA2, and ships with drivers for all of Apple's current and past AirPort Extreme and AirPort cards. Many third-party manufacturers make compatible hardware along with the appropriate drivers which work with Mac OS X's built-in configuration and management software. Other manufacturers distribute their own software.

Apple's older Mac OS 9 supported AirPort and AirPort Extreme as well, and drivers exist for other equipment from other manufacturers, providing Wi-Fi options for earlier systems not designed for AirPort cards. Versions of Mac OS before Mac OS 9 predate Wi-Fi and do not have any Wi-Fi support, although some third-party hardware manufacturers have made drivers and connection software that allows earlier OSes to use Wi-Fi.

Open-source Unix-like systems
Linux, FreeBSD and similar Unix-like clones have much coarser support for Wi-Fi. Due to the open source nature of these operating systems,
many different standards have been developed for configuring and managing Wi-Fi devices. The open source nature also fosters open source drivers which have enabled many third party and proprietary devices to work under these operating systems.  See Comparison of Open Source Wireless Drivers for more information on those drivers.

Linux has patchy Wi-Fi support. This is especially true for older kernel versions, such as the 2.6 series, which is still widely used by enterprise distributions. Native drivers for many Wi-Fi chipsets are available either commercially or at no cost, although some manufacturers don't produce a Linux driver, only a Windows one.  Consequently, many popular chipsets either don't have a native Linux driver at all, or only have a half-finished one. For these, the freely available NdisWrapper and its commercial competitor DriverLoader allow Windows x86 and 64 bit variants NDIS drivers to be used on x86-based Linux systems and 86_64 architectures as of January 6, 2005.   As well as the lack of native drivers, some Linux distributions do not offer a convenient user interface and configuring Wi-Fi on them can be a clumsy and complicated operation compared to configuring wired Ethernet drivers. This is changing with the adoption of utilities such as NetworkManager and wicd that allow users to automatically switch between networks, without root access or command-line invocation of the traditional wireless tools. But some distributions include a large number of preinstalled drivers, like Ubuntu.
FreeBSD has Wi-Fi support similar to Linux.  FreeBSD 7.0 introduced full support for WPA and WPA2, although in some cases this is driver dependent.  FreeBSD comes with drivers for many wireless cards and chipsets, including those made by Atheros, Intel Centrino, Ralink, Cisco, D-link, and Netgear, and provides support for others through the ports collection.  FreeBSD also has "Project Evil", which provides the ability to use Windows x86 NDIS drivers on x86-based FreeBSD systems as NdisWrapper does on Linux, and Windows amd64 NDIS drivers on amd64-based systems.
NetBSD, OpenBSD, and DragonFly BSD have Wi-Fi support similar to FreeBSD.  Code for some of the drivers, as well as the kernel framework to support them, is mostly shared among the 4 BSDs.
Haiku has preliminary Wi-Fi support since September 2009.
Solaris and OpenSolaris have the Wireless Networking Project to provide Wi-Fi drivers and support.
Android has built in support for WiFi, with it being preferred over Mobile telephony networks.
Unison OS has built in support for embedded WiFi for a broad set of modules, with it being preferred over Mobile telephony networks (which also have off the shelf support).  Mixed WiFi and Bluetooth for embedded systems is also provided.

See also

 List of WLAN channels
 Wireless access point

References

External links

 Wi-Fi Alliance

IEEE 802.11
Computer networking
Wi-Fi